Catherine & Co. is a 1975 sex comedy film directed by Michel Boisrond from a screenplay by Catherine Breillat and Léo L. Fuchs, based on the 1967 novel Catherine and Co. by Edouard de Segonzac. The film stars Jane Birkin, Patrick Dewaere, Jean-Pierre Aumont, Vittorio Caprioli and Jean-Claude Brialy.

Plot
Catherine is a young British prostitute who decides to make money living in Paris. After learning about corporate practices and  business ins and outs from her clients, she decides to incorporate as an official escort business. Searching for people to invest in her scheme, she encounters both interest and setbacks.

Cast

Reception
On the film's initial US release in February 1976, Richard Eder of The New York Times described the film as a "sex farce", "sloppy, ill-shaped and very familiar", but with an air of sincerity that allowed the audience to enjoy its positive attributes.  Eder particularly praised the acting of Vittorio Caprioli as an Italian businessman who is one of the protagonist's lovers.  On the other hand, John Simon's review for New York described Birkin as "a nasty baggage" and the film as "the most offensive dungheap masquerading as a movie to be seen in years, perhaps ever." In a review for Time Out, Geoff Brown said the film was "not hot enough to be a sexploiter, but not sophisticated enough to be anything better".

In a 2012 retrospective article about Birkin's films, Australian critic Simon Foster called Catherine & Co. "one of the key films in Birkin's extensive filmography to take advantage of her sexuality at the height of her fame".

References

External links
 

1975 films
1970s sex comedy films
1970s French-language films
Films about prostitution in Paris
Films based on French novels
Films shot in Paris
French sex comedy films
Italian sex comedy films
1970s Italian films
1970s French films